NBA Countdown, branded for sponsorship purposes as NBA Countdown Presented by DraftKings Sportsbook for ESPN editions and  NBA Countdown Presented by Papa John's  for ABC editions respectively, is an American pregame television show airing prior to National Basketball Association (NBA) telecasts on ABC and ESPN.

NBA Countdown typically airs thirty minutes prior to games on ABC and ESPN (with some notable exceptions).

Overview 
Unlike NBC's NBA studio show, which was known as NBA Showtime for the first ten years of its existence, ABC's studio has been without much consistency. It has gone through five names in five seasons, and several analysts in each season. For the 2006–2007 season, the pregame show will be known as NBA Sunday Countdown. Each season, the show has been sponsored by GMC, with exception of the Finals, where it is sponsored by Chevrolet. Mike Tirico hosted the pregame shows from ABC's first season with the NBA to the middle of the network's fourth with the league. On March 19, 2006, Tirico was replaced by ESPN's Dan Patrick, and was moved to the number two play-by-play team. Other hosts of the pregame show include regular substitute John Saunders.

NBA Shootaround 
(December 25, 2002 – June 15, 2003)
Initially, ABC's NBA pregame show was known as NBA Shootaround, and shared virtually the same graphics and music as the ESPN pregame show of the same name. The program was hosted by Mike Tirico, with analysts Bill Walton and Tom Tolbert. Unlike most network pregame shows, Shootaround did not take place in a studio, and instead traveled to a different site each week (much like ESPN's College Gameday). Starting with Game 1 of the 2003 Eastern Conference Finals, Walton was replaced in the pregame show by Sean Elliott. Tolbert was dropped from the pregame show starting with Game 1 of the NBA Finals. Tirico and Elliott were joined by a guest analyst for each game of the Finals.

NBA Hangtime 

(December 25, 2003 – December 25, 2004)
After bad ratings in the 2002–2003 season, ABC retooled much of its NBA coverage. This included its pregame show, which was rebranded NBA Hangtime, and moved into the network's Times Square studios. The pregame show was given new music and graphics, to differentiate itself from its ESPN counterpart, and was still hosted by Mike Tirico. Tom Tolbert was brought back as an analyst, but ABC dropped Bill Walton from pregame show duties. He was replaced by George Karl. After criticism from the media on Karl's lack of opinion during the program, ABC replaced him on February 22, 2004 with former New Jersey Nets coach Byron Scott. NBA Hangtime lasted through the 2003–2004 season, and continued on Christmas Day 2004, prior to the much-hyped Los Angeles Lakers-Miami Heat game. This telecast was the only NBA Hangtime to involve analysts Steve Jones and Bill Walton.

NBA Game Time 
(January 8, 2005 – June 23, 2005)
For most of the 2004–2005 season, ABC's pregame show was known as NBA Game Time. Like Hangtime, it originated from the network's Times Square studios, and was once more hosted by Mike Tirico. Tirico was re-joined by Bill Walton in the studio, and Walton's old broadcast partner from NBC, Steve "Snapper" Jones. Tom Tolbert was dropped, while Byron Scott and George Karl both returned to the NBA coaching ranks. Game Time, unlike its predecessors, included guest analysts, such as Baron Davis, Jalen Rose, Rick Fox, and Bill Russell. During the 2005 Western Conference Finals, Steve Jones fell ill with appendicitis, and was later replaced for the NBA Finals by ESPN analyst Greg Anthony.

NBA Nation 
(December 25, 2005 -June 22, 2006)
Starting on Christmas Day 2005, ABC's NBA pregame show underwent yet another transformation. It adopted the former name of the ESPN2 Tuesday night NBA studio show, and became known as NBA Nation. For most of the season, Mike Tirico hosted the program. He was joined by Scottie Pippen, as Steve Jones and Bill Walton both returned to the broadcast booth. In the first edition of NBA Nation, Pippen was only seen in the final segment of the show. The first three segments involved special-interest stories and a panel of celebrities and sportswriters discussing issues concerning the NBA. This panel of guests was the first of only two. Though it was originally planned for Tirico to be joined by an in-studio panel of guests each week, the plan was evidently scrapped after January 22. Following that, a panel of guests, all of which directly connected to the NBA or basketball in general, joined Tirico via satellite occasionally (with the exception of March 5, when both Mike Krzyzewski and Jerry Colangelo joined Tirico in-studio). Until January 29, the program also featured an NBA-related segment from ESPN's Pardon the Interruption.

On March 3, 2006, the New York Post reported that ABC would replace Tirico with ESPN's Dan Patrick starting on March 19. Tirico moved to the number two play-by-play team, behind Mike Breen, and Patrick hosted ABC's coverage every week, including the NBA Finals. This move ended the most consistent role The NBA on ABC had, which was of Mike Tirico has studio host. In the suddenly revamped edition of NBA Nation, Patrick was joined by Scottie Pippen, who continued his role as pregame analyst, as well as former ESPN commentator and NBA player Mark Jackson and Washington Post and Pardon the Interruption co-host Mike Wilbon on a weekly basis.

On May 12, 2006, the New York Post reported that Pippen had been let go from his duties as studio analyst for ABC, but would remain an analyst for ESPN. ABC went with the team of Dan Patrick, Mark Jackson and Michael Wilbon the rest of the way, representing a complete change from the beginning of the season.

Guests 
December 25, 2005
Chuck D, rapper
Josh Lucas, actor
Bob Ryan, Boston Globe sportswriter
January 22, 2006
Method Man, rapper
Chad Johnson, NFL player
Peter Vecsey, New York Post sportswriter
January 29, 2006
David Thompson, NBA legend
Jack Ramsay, ABC NBA analyst
J.A. Adande, Los Angeles Times sportswriter
February 12, 2006
Michael Wilbon, Washington Post sportswriter
March 5, 2006
Kobe Bryant, Team USA Guard
Mike Krzyzewski, USA Basketball Head Coach
Jerry Colangelo, Director, USA Basketball
March 12, 2006
Byron Scott, New Orleans Hornets Head Coach
Jay Bilas, ESPN college basketball analyst

NBA Sunday Countdown 
With ABC Sports' demise and rebranding as ESPN on ABC, ABC's NBA pregame show was given its fifth different name in as many years. Now known as NBA Sunday Countdown, the show would continue featuring Dan Patrick as host, with analysts Mark Jackson and Michael Wilbon. The show would not originate from Times Square, but instead originate from the site of that week's game (ala the original ABC pregame show, NBA Shootaround). After only two broadcasts, Mark Jackson moved to game coverage exclusively, and was replaced by Jon Barry.

NBA Countdown 
In 2008, the show was renamed NBA Countdown, and Patrick, who left ESPN, was replaced by Stuart Scott, joining Bill Walton, Michael Wilbon, and Barry as a contributor/fill-in.  For the 2008–2009 season (beginning with the Christmas Day doubleheader), Barry replaced Walton full-time, Avery Johnson became the fourth member of the studio team, and Magic Johnson joined the show doing feature interviews and occasionally joining the studio crew as a panelist.  For the 2010–2011 season, Hannah Storm joined Scott as they alternated as host. For the 2011–2012 season, Wilbon was promoted to the host position, with analysis from Barry and Johnson, and Chris Broussard joined as the show as the NBA insider. The show also moved from ESPN HQ in Bristol, Connecticut, to their studios in Los Angeles.

For the 2012–2013 season, Jalen Rose and Bill Simmons replaced Barry and Broussard respectively.  Barry became a color commentator and Broussard a sideline reporter during games.

For the 2013–2014 season, Magic Johnson announced his departure. Doug Collins and Doris Burke will both be new additions to the program. Also, ESPN announced that Sage Steele will be replacing Michael Wilbon as host, ending Wilbon's 8-year run on Countdown.

Magic Johnson and Michael Wilbon were slated to return to the program in January 2017 to join Sage Steele for pregame coverage for the NBA Saturday Primetime on ABC series. With the 2017 playoffs looming, ESPN replaced Sage Steele with Michelle Beadle as the host of NBA Countdown on ABC and ESPN. Beadle joined NBA Countdown at the start of the 2016–2017 season, and has led ESPN's regular Wednesday and Friday episodes. Beadle has been named the full time host and will lead ABC and ESPN's NBA pre-game and halftime shows, including for the 2017 NBA Finals on ABC.

As of February 2018, production of NBA Countdown was moved from ESPN's studios in Los Angeles to ESPN's Bristol, CT studios in the set used for the network's NFL studio shows. In April the show once again relocated to a new studio at Pier 17 in New York as Michelle Beadle is the host of ESPN's new morning show Get Up! which debuted on April 2, 2018.

Over the 2019 off-season, reports began to emerge that ESPN was planning to retool the program. In August 2019, Richard Deitsch reported that Beadle was being dropped from the program, and that her assignment would be split between Rachel Nichols and Maria Taylor. Richard Jefferson and Jay Williams were brought in to replace Chauncey Billups, with the network retaining Jalen Rose and Paul Pierce. In October, ESPN replaced NBA Countdown as its pre-game show for ABC's Saturday Primetime broadcasts in favor of on-site editions of Nichols' studio show, The Jump.

Those plans crumbled after March 8, as the NBA suspended play due to the COVID-19 pandemic. Because of that, Nichols resorted to the NBA Bubble at the ESPN Wide World of Sports Complex at the Walt Disney World Resort in Orlando, FL, where the NBA restarted their season and held the Playoffs, where she eventually took Doris Burke's spot as sideline reporter for the Finals, meaning Taylor was elevated to host the NBA Finals on ABC, and Countdown being restored as ABC's pregame show.

For the 2020–21 season, Nichols was tapped serve as lead sideline reporter for NBA Saturday Primetime, and continue as sideline reporter of the NBA Finals, meaning Taylor was officially promoted to Nichols' spot as host, with Countdown being restored as pregame show. After he was part of an inappropriate Instagram video, ESPN quietly dropped Pierce on April 6, without replacement for the remainder of the season. Prior to the 2021 NBA Finals, Nichols was removed in favor of Malika Andrews after a video revealed of Nichols uttering racially insensitive comments towards black colleague Taylor. Soon after, Taylor departed to join NBC Sports, and Nichols was removed from all ESPN programming. Nichols has since left ESPN.

For the 2021–22 season, Lisa Salters was reinstated as the primary sideline reporter, replacing the departed Nichols. Following the Nichols-Taylor fallout, ESPN tapped Mike Greenberg to replace both Nichols and Taylor on NBA Countdown. ESPN also dropped Williams from Countdown, while retaining Rose, and bringing Michael Wilbon, Stephen A. Smith, and Magic Johnson back. SportsCenter anchor Michael Eaves was tapped to host on Wednesdays alongside Jefferson, Kendrick Perkins, and WNBA star Chiney Ogwumike. Andrews was tapped to fill-in as Countdown host whenever Eaves or Greenberg have other assignments.

Pregame show sites 
Note: ABC's March 9, 2003 edition of NBA Shootaround took place at both Madison Square Garden in New York, with Mike Tirico and Sean Elliott, as well as Staples Center in Los Angeles with analysts Tom Tolbert and Bill Walton.
San Antonio, TX
March 23, 2003, June 4, 2003, June 6. 2003, June 15, 2003, June 9, 2005, June 12, 2005, June 21, 2005, June 23, 2005, May 12, 2007, May 20, 2007, June 7, 2007, June 10, 2007
Auburn Hills, MI
May 18, 2003, June 10, 2004, June 13, 2004, June 14, 2004, June 15, 2005, June 16, 2005, June 19, 2005, February 25, 2007, March 18, 2007, April 8, 2007
Los Angeles, CA
December 25, 2002, March 9, 2003, April 27, 2003, May 11, 2003, May 15, 2003, June 6, 2004, June 8, 2004, December 25, 2004
Miami, FL
June 13, 2006, June 15, 2006, June 18, 2006, December 8, 2006, January 21, 2007, February 11, 2007, December 25, 2014
Dallas, TX
January 4, 2003, June 8, 2006, June 11, 2006, June 20, 2006, April 15, 2007
Cleveland, OH
January 28, 2007, May 6, 2007, June 12, 2007, June 14, 2007
Sacramento, CA
February 16, 2003, March 16, 2003, March 11, 2007, March 25, 2007
East Rutherford, NJ
June 8, 2003, June 11, 2003, June 13, 2003
Phoenix, AZ
March 4, 2007, April 1, 2007, April 22, 2007
Minneapolis, MN
March 30, 2003, April 20, 2003
Chicago, IL
April 21, 2007, May 13, 2007
Washington, D.C.
February 23, 2003
New York City, NY
March 9, 2003
Philadelphia, PA
April 6, 2003
Portland, OR
April 13, 2003
Salt Lake City, UT
May 26, 2007
Secaucus, NJ
May 23, 2003 (for 2003 NBA Draft Lottery)

Personalities

Current 
Mike Greenberg (host, 2021–present)
Jalen Rose (analyst, 2012–present)
Michael Wilbon (host/analyst, 2005–2013, 2016–2017, 2021-present)
Stephen A. Smith (analyst, 2019–present)
Magic Johnson (part-time analyst, 2008–2013, 2016–2017, 2021-present)
Adrian Wojnarowski (insider, 2017–present)
Michael Eaves (Wednesday host, 2022–present)
Malika Andrews (fill-in host, 2022–present)
Richard Jefferson (analyst, 2019–present; Wednesday analyst, 2022–present)
Kendrick Perkins (analyst, 2019–present, Wednesday analyst, 2022–present)
Chiney Ogwumike (Wednesday analyst, 2022–present)

Former

Past Analysts 
Bill Walton (analyst, 2002–2003, 2004–2005, 2007–2008)
Tom Tolbert (analyst, 2002–2004)
Sean Elliott (analyst, 2003)
George Karl (analyst, 2003–2004)
Byron Scott (analyst, 2004)
Steve Jones (analyst, 2004–2005)
Greg Anthony (analyst, 2005 NBA Finals)
Scottie Pippen (analyst, 2005–2006)
Mark Jackson (analyst, 2006–2007)
Jon Barry (analyst, 2007–2012)
Avery Johnson (analyst, 2008–2010, 2013–2015)
Chris Broussard (NBA insider, 2012)
Bill Simmons (analyst, 2012–2014)
Doug Collins (analyst, 2013–2016)
Chauncey Billups (analyst, 2015–2019)
Paul Pierce (analyst, 2017–2021)
Jay Williams (analyst, 2019–2021)
Stan Van Gundy (fill-in analyst; 2019)

Past Hosts 
Mike Tirico (host, 2002–2006)
Dan Patrick (host, 2006–2007)
Stuart Scott (host, 2008–2011)
Hannah Storm (host, 2010–2011)
Doris Burke (host, 2013–2016)
Sage Steele (host, 2013–2017)
Michelle Beadle (host, 2016–2019)
Maria Taylor (host, 2019–2021)

References 

2002 American television series debuts
American Broadcasting Company original programming
ABC Sports
Countdown
ESPN
2000s American television series
2010s American television series
2020s American television series